Jarabe de Palo ("Wooden Stick Syrup" or, by virtue of the Spanish expression "dar un jarabe de palo", i.e. a "hell of a beating") were a Spanish rock band founded in 1996, once led by singer, songwriter and guitarist Pau Donés, who, on 9 June 2020, died at the age of 53, and this brought the band to dissolution.

History

Foundation and beginnings 
The band was founded in 1996 in Barcelona, Spain, and has always had singer-songwriter Pau Donés as vocalist and lead guitarist.

Going independent 
In 2008, the band announced they were going to leave their record company and go independent, founding their own record label Tronco Records. They changed their name to "Jarabedepalo" because their former record label had the rights to the name.

In 2009 they released, Orquesta Reciclando (Recycling Orchestra), in which they recorded new versions of their old songs, and one new song. ¿Y Ahora que Hacemos? (Now What Are We Going to Do?), was released in 2011 and Somos (We Are) in 2014.

Dissolution 
On 9 June 2020 Donés died aged 53 near Barcelona, after a five-year period of colon cancer, and for this reason his band was dissolved.

Awards and collaborations 

The group has received Premios de la Música, Premio Ondas and Grammy nominations. They have collaborated with La Vieja Trova Santiaguera, Antonio Vega, Vico C and Celia Cruz (soundtrack of El milagro de P. Tinto). Donés has also composed tracks for Ricky Martin and starred in a music video with Alanis Morissette. They also collaborated with Italian musicians Jovanotti, Niccolò Fabi, Modà and Ermal Meta.

Discography 

1996 - La Flaca
1998 - Depende
2001 - De Vuelta y Vuelta
2003 - Bonito
2004 - 1m² (Un Metro Cuadrado)
2005 - Samba Pa' Ti - Un Tributo a Brasil
2007 - Adelantando2009 - Orquesta Reciclando 
2011 - ¿Y ahora que hacemos? 
2014 - Somos 
2015 - TOUR AMERICANO 
2017 - 50 PALOS 
2020 - TRAGAS O ESCUPES''

Band members

Current 
David Muñoz - guitar
Jordi Vericat - bass, background vocals
Alex Tenas - drums
Jaime Burgos - keyboards, piano
Jimmy Jenks Jimenez - sax

Former 
Pau Donés - vocals, guitar (died 2020)
Jordi Mena - guitar
Dani Forcada - percussion
Joan Gené - bass
Marià Roch - bass
Toni-Chupi Saigi - keyboards
Quino Béjar - percussion
Toni Saigi - keyboards
Kyke Serrano - keyboards
Dani Baraldes - guitar
Jordi Busquets - guitar
Carmen Niño - bass
Riki Frouchtman - guitar

References

External links 
 
 
 

Spanish rock music groups
Musical groups from Catalonia
Warner Music Latina artists
Latin pop music groups
Nacional Records artists